Robert Sycz (born 15 November 1973 in Warsaw) is a Polish rower, and double Olympic Champion.

Sycz started his rowing career with SWOS 2 (Szkolny Wojewódzki Ośrodek Sportowy nr 2) in Warsaw. He currently competes for RTW Bydgostia in Bydgoszcz. Together with Tomasz Kucharski, Rober Sycz won two gold Olympic medals (in Sydney 2000 and in Athens 2004) in men's lightweight double sculls. This pair also won two gold medals (1997, 1998) and three silver medals (2001, 2002, 2003) at the World Rowing Championships.

For his sport achievements, he received the Order of Polonia Restituta:
  Knight's Cross (5th Class) in 2000
  Officer's Cross (4th Class) in 2004

Sycz was listed as the number two male rower of 2009 in the 2010 FOCUS issue of FISA's World Rowing Magazine. In 2012,

Achievements

 Olympic Medals: 2 Gold
 World Championship Medals: 2 Gold, 3 Silver, 1 Bronze

Olympic Games

 2004 – Gold, Lightweight Double Sculls (with Tomasz Kucharski)
 2000 – Gold, Lightweight Double Sculls (with Tomasz Kucharski)
 1996 – 7th, Lightweight Double Sculls (with Grzegorz Wdowiak)

World Rowing Championships
 2009 – 4th, Lightweight Double Sculls (with Mariusz Stańczuk)
 2006 – 5th, Lightweight Double Sculls (with Tomasz Kucharski)
 2005 – Bronze, Lightweight Double Sculls (with Paweł Rańda)
 2003 – Silver, Lightweight Double Sculls (with Tomasz Kucharski)
 2002 – Silver, Lightweight Double Sculls (with Tomasz Kucharski)
 2001 – Silver, Lightweight Double Sculls (with Tomasz Kucharski)
 1998 – Gold, Lightweight Double Sculls (with Tomasz Kucharski)
 1997 – Gold, Lightweight Double Sculls (with Tomasz Kucharski)
 1995 – 5th, Lightweight Double Sculls (with Grzegorz Wdowiak)
 1994 – 7th, Lightweight Double Sculls (with Grzegorz Wdowiak)
 1993 – 6th, Lightweight Double Sculls (with Grzegorz Wdowiak)

References

External links 
 

1973 births
Living people
Rowers from Warsaw
Polish male rowers
Olympic rowers of Poland
Rowers at the 1996 Summer Olympics
Rowers at the 2000 Summer Olympics
Rowers at the 2004 Summer Olympics
Olympic gold medalists for Poland
Olympic medalists in rowing
Medalists at the 2004 Summer Olympics
World Rowing Championships medalists for Poland
Medalists at the 2000 Summer Olympics